Lotus is a former village in Brevard County, Florida, United States. It is the location of Honeymoon Hill, the highest point on Merritt Island. Only one road runs through the area, CR 3, accessible to the south by Pineda Causeway and from the north via Florida State Road 520.

Lotus is a wealthy residential area in Brevard County, with homes overlooking both the Indian River and Banana River Lagoons.  Lotus along with Tropic, south of the Pineda Causeway lost their identity as individual villages during the beginning of the Space Age in the 1960s as the entire area fell under single family residential zoning only as part of the larger Merritt Island.

Geography
The area is located between Honeymoon Hill and the Pineda Causeway. Around Honeymoon Hill, this area is known as Fairyland.

Georgiana    
Banana River, Patrick Space Force Base 
Tropic 
Pineda, Bonaventure

Honeymoon Hill
Honeymoon Hill is the highest point on Merritt Island and one of the highest points in Brevard County. The area on the eastern shore of Honeymoon Lake is known as Fairyland, which was named after the expression "up to the heavens." Fairyland is known for its homes resting on top of the hill, overlooking South Tropical Trail, the lagoons, and the lake.

Honeymoon Lake

Honeymoon Lake is a lake in the former towns Georgiana, Fairyland, and Lotus. There is a hidden historic ferry passage when this was one of the early settled areas of Merritt Island. It links the Indian River lagoon via the passage. The depth of this lake is at most chest deep, but usually shallower.

References

Merritt Island, Florida
Former populated places in Florida